Stuart Duncan Davies CBE FREng FRAeS (5 December 1906 – 22 January 1995) was a British aerospace engineer who was in charge of the design of the Avro Vulcan. He was also responsible for converting the unsuccessful two-engined Avro Manchester into the four-engined Avro Lancaster.

Early life
He was the son of William Davies and Alice Duncan. He attended Westminster City grammar school in central London from 1918 to 1923.

Career

Vauxhall
His career began at Vauxhall Motors where he worked for two years from the age of 16.

Vickers

He worked at Vickers as a junior technical assistant from 1925 and gained an external BSc degree in Engineering at Northampton Polytechnic (now City University London) awarded by the University of London. At Vickers he worked in the wind tunnel at Brooklands, and on the Virginia biplane bomber, converting it from a wooden to metal structure.

Hawker
In 1931 he moved to Hawker Aircraft at Kingston upon Thames. He worked in the stress office, in a team of seven. There he worked on the Hart and Fury biplanes; the RAF's main fighter planes in the 1930s. In 1933 he began work on what would become the Hawker Hurricane, then known as the Fury Monoplane.

Avro
Hawker Siddeley was formed in 1935, and in the group it included A.V.Roe & Company of Manchester. In January 1938 he moved to Avro, becoming assistant to the chief designer. Aged 33, he was promoted to be the company's experimental manager in April 1940. In 1940 he became responsible for converting the Manchester into the Lancaster. 7,377 Lancasters would be built in the UK and Canada, having first flown at Woodford on 8 January 1941.

From 1944 he was in charge of the Avro York transport plane, and later worked on the Avro Lincoln.

In 1947 he became the technical director at Avro, with responsibility for producing the Avro Vulcan (Avro 698), which first flew on 30 August 1952. He was Chief Designer from 1945 to 1955, and was succeeded by Roy Ewans. Five Avro 707 aircraft were produced before the Vulcan. They were used for experimental work on the delta wing.

He also designed the Avro Athena advanced single-engined trainer.

The Avro Atlantic was an early-1950s proposed 94-seat airliner version of the Vulcan, with delta wings and Olympus engines, which was never built.

Later career
He left Avro in June 1955 for Dowty Rotol, becoming managing director of Dowty Fuel Systems in Cheltenham, and returned to Hawker Siddeley Aviation from 1958 to 1964. He left aviation for general engineering. He was President from 1971–2 of the Royal Aeronautical Society. In 1958 he received the RAeS Gold Medal. He became an FEng in 1977. He was an honorary Fellow of the RAeS.

Personal life
In 1935 he married Ethel Radcliffe. She died before him. They had one daughter in 1939, born in north-east Cheshire. He was awarded the CBE in 1968.

He died on 22 January 1995 aged 88.

See also
 Sir Roy Dobson, managing director of Avro in the 1950s.
 James C. Floyd
 John Fozard, designer of the Harrier
 Reginald Stafford, designer of the Handley Page Victor

References

 Times obituary, 11 February 1995, page 19

External links
 Avro Heritage
 History of the Vulcan

1906 births
1995 deaths
Alumni of City, University of London
Avro Lancaster
Avro Vulcan
Commanders of the Order of the British Empire
English aerospace engineers
Fellows of the Royal Academy of Engineering
Fellows of the Royal Aeronautical Society
Hawker Siddeley
People educated at Westminster City School
Royal Aeronautical Society Gold Medal winners